Antillogorgia bipinnata, the bipinnate sea plume, is a species of colonial soft coral, a sea fan in the family Gorgoniidae. It is found in the Caribbean Sea. It was first described as Pseudopterogorgia bipinnata  in 1864 by the American zoologist Addison Emery Verrill. Williams and Chen (2012), transferred all the Atlantic species of Pseudopterogorgia to Antillogorgia.

DescriptionAntillogorgia bipinnata is a colonial soft coral growing in the form of a bipinnate fan usually in a single plane. It consists of a main stem with several branches, with regularly-spaced pairs of branchlets. The apertures from which the polyps protrude are small and slit-like and are arranged in staggered double rows on either side of the branchlets. The colour of this sea fan is usually violet or purple but may be yellow or whitish.

Distribution and habitatAntillogorgia bipinnata is found in shallow water reefs in the Bahamas, South Florida and the Caribbean Sea.

Biology
Mature specimens of Antillogorgia bipinnata have symbiotic unicellular algae known as zooxanthellae in their tissues, but these are not present in the planula larvae and the polyp into which it metamorphosizes. Researchers reared these larvae in algae-free environments and then attempted to infect the resulting polyps with various strains of dinoflagellate.  Some of these were observed to be attracted to the polyps and actively swam into their open mouths; successful infection was achieved with some strains of dinoflagellate and not with others.

Secondary metabolites
Several secondary metabolites have been isolated from Antillogorgia bipinnata'' including the cytotoxic cembranoids denoted bipinnatin A to D, and the diterpene bipinnatin J.

References

Gorgoniidae
Corals described in 1864